CleanBrowsing is a free public DNS resolver with content filtering, founded by Daniel B. Cid and Tony Perez. It supports DNS TLS over port 853 and DNS over HTTP over port 443 in addition to the standard DNS over port 53. CleanBrowsing filters can be used by parents to protect their children from adult and inappropriate content online.

Services

CleanBrowsing has 3 standard filters accessible via the following anycast IP addresses:

Family Filter 

Blocks access to adult content, proxy and VPNs, phishing and malicious domains. It enforces Safe Search on Google, Bing and YouTube.

Adult Filter 

Less restrictive than the Family filter and only blocks access to adult content and malicious/phishing domains.

Security Filter 

Blocks access to malicious and phishing domains.

See also 
 DNS over TLS
 Public recursive name servers

References

External links 
 

Alternative Internet DNS services